A process is a series or set of activities that interact to produce a result; it may occur once-only or be recurrent or periodic.

Things called a process include:

Business and management
Business process, activities that produce a specific service or product for customers
Business process modeling, activity of representing processes of an enterprise in order to deliver improvements
Manufacturing process management, a collection of technologies and methods used to define how products are to be manufactured. 
Process architecture, structural design of processes, applies to fields such as computers, business processes, logistics, project management
Process area, related processes within an area which together satisfies an important goal for improvements within that area
Process costing, a cost allocation procedure of managerial accounting
Process management (project management), a systematic series of activities directed towards planning, monitoring the performance and causing an end result in engineering activities, business process, manufacturing processes or project management
Process-based management, is a management approach that views a business as a collection of processes
Process industry, a category of material-related industry

Law
Due process, the concept that governments must respect the rule of law
Legal process, the proceedings and records of a legal case
Service of process, the procedure of giving official notice of a legal proceeding

Science and technology
The general concept of the scientific process, see scientific method
Process theory, the scientific study of processes
Industrial processes, consists of the purposeful sequencing of tasks that combine resources to produce a desired output

Biology and psychology
Process (anatomy), a projection or outgrowth of tissue from a larger body
Biological process, a process of a living organism
Cognitive process, such as attention, memory, language use, reasoning, and problem solving
Mental process, a function or processes of the mind
Neuronal process, also neurite, a projection from the cell body of a neuron

Chemistry
Chemical process, a method or means of changing one or more chemicals or chemical compounds
Unit process, a step in manufacturing in which chemical reaction takes place

Computing
Process (computing), a computer program, or running a program concurrently with other programs
Child process, created by another process
Parent process
Process management (computing), an integral part of any modern-day operating system (OS)
Processing (programming language), an open-source language and integrated development environment

Mathematics
In probability theory:
Branching process, a Markov process that models a population
Diffusion process, a solution to a stochastic differential equation
Empirical process, a stochastic process that describes the proportion of objects in a system in a given state
Lévy process, a stochastic process with independent, stationary increments
Poisson process, a point process consisting of randomly located points on some underlying space
Predictable process, a stochastic process whose value is knowable
Stochastic process, a random process, as opposed to a deterministic process
Wiener process, a continuous-time stochastic process
Process calculus, a diverse family of related approaches for formally modeling concurrent systems
Process function, a mathematical concept used in thermodynamics

Thermodynamics
Process function, a mathematical concept used in thermodynamics
Thermodynamic process, the energetic evolution of a thermodynamic system
Adiabatic process, which proceeds without transfer of heat or matter between a system and its surroundings
Isenthalpic process, in which enthalpy stays constant
Isobaric process, in which the pressure stays constant
Isochoric process, in which volume stays constant
Isothermal process, in which temperature stays constant
Polytropic process, which obeys the equation 
Quasistatic process, which occurs infinitely slowly, as an approximation

Other uses
The Process, a concept in the film 3%
Food processing,  transformation of raw ingredients, by physical or chemical means into food
Language processing in the brain 
Natural language processing
Praxis (process), in philosophy, the process by which a theory or skill is enacted or realized
Process (engineering), set of interrelated tasks that transform inputs into outputs
Process philosophy, which regards change as the cornerstone of reality 
Process thinking, a philosophy that focuses on present circumstances
Writing process, a concept in writing and composition studies

External links

Business process
Business process management
Process engineering
Industrial processes
Technology-related lists
Legal procedure
Biological processes
Chemical processes
Process (computing)